Personality Comics was a short-lived American comic book publishing company that specialized in unauthorized biographies of entertainers and professional athletes, adult comics, and parodies, frequently combining all three genres.

Operating from 1991 to  1993, the company published a myriad of titles under a variety of imprint labels. A typical Personality Comics title featured a painted portrait of the subject on the cover, with black-and-white art inside. (Many of Personality's titles were not comics per se, as they were primarily text with illustrations rather than sequential art.) Regular contributors included Robert Schnakenberg, Mark Caraballo, Hector Diaz, Neil Feigeles, and Pat Henkel. Notable creators associated with the company included John Tartaglione, Jimmy Palmiotti, Barry Blair, Fred Hembeck, and Adam Hughes.

Originally based in Massapequa, New York, the company later moved to Melville, New York.

History 
Adam Post and Eric Shefferman, long-time friends and recent college graduates, formed Personality Comics at the height of the comic speculator boom in 1991, to take advantage of the popularity of erotic comics as exemplified by Fantagraphics' Eros Comics line, and biographical comics as exemplified by Revolutionary Comics' Rock 'N' Roll Comics series. Without much background in the industry, they hired industry veteran John Tartaglione to help guide their development as a company (and provide art on some titles). They expanded quickly, mostly hiring inexperienced creators at fairly low rates.

The industry's largest distributor, Diamond Comic Distributors — wary of legal issues related to the company's unauthorized biography lines — refused to carry Personality's titles; but the second largest distributor, Capital City Distribution, did carry the company's books, making sure their titles reached comic book specialty stores and newsstands. (Later, Diamond reversed its decision not to distribute Personality's titles.)

The company's first title, released under the Friendly Comics imprint, was an X-rated series called Bambi and Friends, written by co-founders Post and Shefferman and drawn by Myke Maldonado. Debuting in January 1991, Bambi and Friends eventually published eight monthly issues, and then a number of follow-up limited series featuring the same character.

In March 1991, the company released its flagship title, Personality Comics Presents, featuring supermodel Paulina Porizkova. The title's second issue, featuring Traci Lords, was particularly popular. The company's Sports Personalities series debuted with a July 1991 issue, featuring Bo Jackson (that series eventually ran 14 issues). Not all of the company's biography comics were unauthorized; as Post claimed, "DeForest Kelley... and Kim Basinger had sent autographed copies of their biographies, and... Walter Koenig... had edited his."

Within a short time, the publisher found great success, putting out over 30 different comics per month, making it the eighth-largest comics publisher in the United States by the summer of 1992.

In the summer of 1992, the company created the Spoof Comics parody imprint, headlined by Spoof Comics Presents, which eventually ran 19 issues. The vast majority of the Spoof imprint titles featured eroticized parodies of popular DC Comics and Marvel Comics heroes, represented as female regardless of their original gender.

Personality's head writer was Robert Schnakenberg, who authored more than 50 comics under a variety of pseudonyms. The company's Cutting Edge Productions imprint was edited by editor-in-chief Kirk Lindo, "who would achieve greater notoriety" at Everette Hartsoe's London Night Studios. Lindo spearheaded the company's line of aspirational superhero titles, such as the Black character Rescueman and a super-powered character who worked to ameliorate the HIV/AIDS crisis.

Closure 
In February 1993, Personality announced that it had acquired the rights to the hobbyist magazine Amazing Heroes, which had ceased publishing in July 1992, with plans to revive it in the summer of 1993. Nothing came of this, however, as the comics speculator market collapsed, and Personality accrued huge debts, essentially shutting down by the summer of 1993 (with the rights to Amazing Heroes eventually reverting back to Fantagraphics). Altogether, Personality Comics published nearly 80 titles and over 200 individual issues.

In early 1994, Post and Sheffernan, along with Revolutionary Comics, and Diamond and Capital City distributors, settled a lawsuit brought by football player Joe Montana based on both company's unauthorized biographies of him and the use of his likeness. (In Personality's case, the issue in question was Football Heroes #3, published in 1992.)

Post-Personality 
As Personality wound down in 1993, Post and Shefferman formed the superhero publisher Triumphant Comics (a division of Corporate Kingdom Holdings, Inc.), based in East Farmingdale, New York. Triumphant promoted its news titles with ashcan editions with print runs of 50,000. The company's longest-running titles were Scavengers (12 issues, July 1993May 1994), The Chromium Man (11 issues, April 1994May 1994), and Riot Gear (9 issues, 19931994). Notable creators associated with Triumphant included Greg Fox. The company collapsed in late 1994 with huge debts, both coporate and personal to Post and Shefferman.

In 1995, Post founded yet another new publisher: Pop Comics (legally known as Whitney Publishing Company), which, like Personality, focused on biographical comics. (David Campiti, later co-founder of Innovation Publishing, was Pop Comics' art director.) Despite using established creators like Adam Hughes, Jimmy Palmiotti, and Bill Sienkiewicz, Pop Comics never got off the ground because Diamond Comic Distributors again refused to carry the company's titles.

In 1996–1998, Post ran another new publisher — Angel Entertainment (a.k.a. Adam Post, Inc.), based in El Jobean, Florida — which, like Personality, specialized in erotic comics; titles included Vampire Girl, Angel Girl, Dream Angel, and Secret Files. The company's longest running-titles were Forbidden Vampire Tales (7 issues), Vampire Girls: Erotique (6 issues), and Bloodhound (4 issues).

In 2013, Bluewater Productions published the comic Fame: Jackie Robinson, a reprint of a Personality Comics issue from 1992. The comic was edited by Adam Post and co-branded with Personality Comics, long after the company had gone defunct.

Imprints and titles (selected)

Unauthorized biographies 
Imprints: Celebrity Comics, (debuted Jan. 1992) Personality Comics
 The New Crew (11 issues, July 1991October 1992, plus an annual) profiles of actors from Star Trek: The Next Generation television series, including Denise Crosby, LeVar Burton, Gates McFadden, Marina Sirtis, and Michael Dorn
 The Original Crew (12 issues, June 1991summer 1992, plus an annual) profiles of actors from the original Star Trek television series, including William Shatner, Leonard Nimoy, DeForest Kelley, James Doohan, Majel Barrett, Mark Lenard and Walter Koenig
 Personality Classics (4 issues, 1991) profiles of John Wayne, Marilyn Monroe, Elvis Presley, and James Dean
 Personality Comics Presents (18 issues, March 1991summer 1992) profiles included Paulina Porizkova and Cassandra Peterson
 Secret Agents (3 issues, Nov. 1991Jan. 1992) — profiles of James Bond actors Sean Connery, Roger Moore, and Timothy Dalton
 Teen Comics (6 issues, Sept. 1992Mar. 1993) — profiles of teen idols like Shannen Doherty, Luke Perry, the cast of Melrose Place, Mark Wahlberg, Madonna, and Prince

Music 
 The Beatles (4 issues, November 1991February 1992)
 Guns N' Roses (2 issues, 1992)
 Kiss (2 issues, Apr. 1992June 1992)
 Led Zeppelin (4 issues, 1992)
 Madonna (2 issues, Sept. 1991fall 1991)
 Madonna: Sex Goddess (4 issues, 1992) — focus on the singer's renegade sexuality
 Music Comics (5 issues, 19911992) profiles of Kiss, Red Hot Chili Peppers, Elvis Presley, The Cure, and Metallica
 Pink Floyd (3 issues, 1992)
 Rock Classics (2 issues, 1992)
 Rolling Stones (3 issues, 1992)

Sports 
 Baseball Sluggers (4 issues, 1992) — profiles of Ken Griffey Jr., David Justice, Frank Thomas, and Don Mattingly
 Best Pitchers (3 issues, 1992) — profiles of Nolan Ryan, Dwight Gooden, and Roger Clemens
 Football Heroes (3 issues, 1992) — profiles of Joe Namath, John Elway, and Joe Montana
 Shaquille O'Neal vs. Michael Jordan (2 issues, 1992) — profiles and comparisons of Shaquille O'Neal and Michael Jordan
 Slam Dunk Kings (4 issues, 1992) — profiles of Michael Jordan, David Robinson, Patrick Ewing, and Charles Barkley
 Sports Classics (5 issues, December 1991September 1992) profiles included Babe Ruth and Mickey Mantle
 Sports Comics (5 issues, 1992) profiles included Ken Griffey Jr., Magic Johnson, Kirby Puckett and Riddick Bowe
 Sports Personalities (14 issues, July 19911992)

Erotic titles 
Imprints: AC Adult Comics, Friendly Comics
 Bad Girls (3 issues, 1992)
 Bambi and Friends (9 issues, JanuarySeptember 1991)
 Bambi the Hunter (5 issues, 1992)
 Bambi in Heat (3 issues, 1992)
 Female Fantasies (4 issues, 1992)
 Female Sex Pirates (2 issues, 1992)
 The Paddler (3 issues, 1992)x-rated parody of Marvel Comics' Punisher
 Sapphire: The City of Sin (1 issue, 1992)
 Sex Trek (3 issues, 1992)x-rated parody of Star Trek: The Original Series
 Sex Trek: The Next Infiltration (3 issues, 1992)x-rated parody of Star Trek: The Next Generation
 Sex Trek: To Boldly Go (3 issues, 1992)x-rated parody of Star Trek: The Original Series
 X-Shemales (2 issues, 1992)
 XXX-Women (3 issues, Jan.March 1992)x-rated parody of the X-Men
 XXX Women: Phallus Rising (3 issues, 1992)
 XXX-Women: A Woman's Work (1 issue, 1992)

Parody titles 
Imprints: Spoof Comics, Humor Comics (debuted Feb. 1992)
 Bloodskirt (1 issue, 1992) — erotic-tinged parody of DC's Bloodsport
 Big Berd versus Arnold Schwarzenheimer (2 issues, 1992)parody battle between Big Bird and Arnold Schwarzenegger
 Cyberfemmes (1 issue, 1992)
 Fantastic Femmes
 Kisses (1 issue, Dec. 1992) — "what if"-style comic about a female version of the band Kissby Allan Jacobsen
 Punish-Her Score Journal (1 issue, May 1993)erotic-tinged parody of Marvel's The Punisher War Journal
 Soul Trek (2 issues, 1992)Blaxploitation-style mashup of Star Trek and Soul Train written by Robert Schnakenberg; now part of the permanent collection of The Museum of Uncut Funk, a virtual museum "dedicated to the celebration and preservation of the Funk."
 Spoof Comics Presents (19 issues, July 1992July 1993) spoofs of popular DC Comics and Marvel Comics superheroines
 WildC.h.i.c.k.s (1 issue, 1992)parody of Image Comics' WildC.A.T.s.
 Wolverbroad vs. Hobo (1 issue, 1992)parody battle between Marvels' Wolverine and DC's Lobo
 X-Babes (1 issue, 1993)parody of the X-Men written by Robert Schnakenberg
 Youngspud (1 issue, 1992)erotic-tinged parody of Image Comics' Youngblood

Superheroes and science fiction 
Imprints: Best Comics (debuted Oct. 1991), Cutting Edge Productions
 Balloonatics (1 issue, Oct. 1991)
 Rescueman (1 issue, Aug. 1992) — Black superhero comic by Kirk Lindo
 Vortex the Wonder Mule (3 issues, 1992) — by Michael Halbleib

Nonfiction 
Imprints: Bible Comics, Real Life Comics
 Healthman: The AIDS Crisis (1 issue, 1992) — written by Robert Schnakenberg
 The Story of Jesus (1 issue, 1992)

See also

 Revolutionary Comics
 Boneyard Press
 The Big Book Of

Notes

References 
 
 
 Who's Who of American Comics Books, 1928–1999

1991 establishments in New York (state)
1993 disestablishments in New York (state)
Comic book publishing companies of the United States
Companies based in Nassau County, New York
Companies based in Suffolk County, New York
Defunct comics and manga publishing companies
Defunct book publishing companies of the United States
Defunct privately held companies of the United States
Erotic comics
Huntington, New York
Oyster Bay (town), New York
Publishing companies established in 1991
Publishing companies disestablished in 1993
Privately held companies based in New York (state)